Kevin Wood may refer to:
 Kevin Wood (footballer)
 Kevin Wood (guitarist)